The 1913 Milan–San Remo was the seventh edition of the Milan–San Remo cycle race and was held on 30 March 1913. The race started in Milan and finished in San Remo. The race was won by Odile Defraye.

General classification

References

1913
1913 in road cycling
1913 in Italian sport
March 1913 sports events